A belly chain or waist chain is the popular English term for the Indian jewelry called kamarband. The belly chain is a type of body jewelry worn around the waist. Some belly chains attach to a navel piercing; these are also called "pierced belly chains". They are often made of silver or gold. Sometimes a thread is used around the waist instead of a chain. The chain may be delicate and thin, or heavy and thick.

Belly chains are considered auspicious for women in Indian culture.

History

The use of waist chains can be traced back to 4000 years or more originating in the Indian Subcontinent. Historically, waist chains have been used in India, by men and women, as ornaments and as part of religious ceremonies, as accessories and to show affluence.

Many ancient sculptures and paintings from locations in India, dating back to the Indus Valley civilization, indicate that waist chains were a very popular jewelry. Many deities in the Hinduism, such as Lord Krishna, wore waist chains. A waistband called cummerbund or patka was a part of the medieval upper class costume of Rajasthanis.

A 14th-century poetry indicates that the waist chain has been a fashion for men in some parts of South India

Contemporary practice and trends

Belly chains are common among women in India. In some regions waist chains are common among men as well. In the southern Indian state of Tamil Nadu, every newborn receives a waist chain as a cultural pact.

Namboothri men generally wear waist strings even as adults. In some aristocratic families, Namboothiri men wore a flattened triple gold string around the waist. As a Hindu custom newborns get a waist chain (Aranjanam) on the 28th day after their birth. In Kerala, almost all newborns irrespective of the religious affiliation get a waist chain. Although many boys generally abandon waist chains during their teenage years, most girls and a sizable number of boys continue to wear waist chains as adults. A follower of Lord Siva is expected to wear a chain, with Rudrakshas strung in a white chain with one hundred beads, around the waist. In Lakshdweep a silver thread is worn by both men and women. Dhodia and Kathodis or Katkari men use ornaments around the waist.

For cultural reasons, waist chains became a fashion accessory for women and men in many parts of the world.

A similar garment of beads worn around the waist has appeared in several aspects of African culture such as dress, childcare, and relationships. Notably in Ghanaian and Nigerian culture, these waist beads have functioned as slings for loincloths, and as support when a child is carried on one’s back. In childcare, they have been included as part of naming ceremonies and to measure growth until puberty. As the practice has spread throughout the diaspora, they have become accessories to express femininity, enhance sexuality by drawing attention to the hips, and serve as a symbol of fertility. Some women also wear them to achieve the appearance of a desired hourglass body shape.”

Medical application
A U.S. patent was issued for using a waist chain as a continuous monitoring device to facilitate weight loss, an item which is available in the market.

See also
Chatelaine (chain)
Necklace
Waist cincher

References

External links
 Importance of belly chain for belly dancers

Chains
Types of jewellery